Roseworthy may refer to:
 Roseworthy, Cornwall, a place in England
 Roseworthy, South Australia, a town in Australia
 Roseworthy College, a campus of the University of Adelaide, near the town